Loreto Grammar School is a convent grammar school for girls in Omagh, County Tyrone, Northern Ireland. The teaching age range is 11–18

It is a Roman Catholic school, founded in 1855, and is now under the trusteeship of the Loreto Education Trust.

Academics
In 2018, 99.2% of its entrants achieved five or more GCSEs at grades A* to C, including the core subjects English and Maths, and the school was ranked 12th out of 191 schools in Northern Ireland.

Also in 2018, 81.8% of its entrants to the A-level exam achieved A*-C grades.

Notable alumni
 Sheelagh Murnaghan (1924-1993) - politician

See also
 List of schools in Northern Ireland

References

External links
 Loreto Grammar School website
 Schoolsnet review

Educational institutions established in 1855
Grammar schools in County Tyrone
Catholic secondary schools in Northern Ireland
Omagh
1855 establishments in Ireland